"Freedom" is the eighth single by the band Girl Next Door and released by Avex Trax on June 16, 2010. "Freedom" is the theme song of the Japanese drama Jotei Kaoruko.

CD Track listing
 Freedom
 
 Seeds of Dream (Blooming Remix)
 Freedom (Instrumental)

DVD Track listing
 Freedom (Music Video)

Charts

Oricon Sales Chart

External links
 Official website 

2010 singles
Girl Next Door (band) songs
Japanese television drama theme songs
2010 songs
Avex Trax singles
Song articles with missing songwriters